Oosterdijk may refer to:

 The Holland America Line freighter Oosterdijk, later USS Oosterdijk (ID-2586)
Oosterdijk, Netherlands, a hamlet in North Holland